This is a list of waterfalls in California, ordered by county.

Northern California

Alameda County
Murrietta Falls –

Alpine County
Llewellyn Falls – 
Wolf Creek Falls –

Amador County
Moore Creek Falls

Calaveras County
North Fork Stanislaus River Falls (Portage 24 Falls)

Butte County

Phantom Falls (Coal Canyon Falls) – 
Feather Falls –  + 
Frenchy's Falls

El Dorado County

Bassi Falls – 
Bridal Veil Falls (Esmeralda Falls) – 
Eagle Falls – 
Glen Alpine Falls (Big Falls) – 
Horsetail Falls –  + 
Modjeska Falls (Upper Glen Alpine Falls) – 
Pyramid Creek Cascades (Lower Horsetail Falls) – 
Traverse Creek Falls

Humboldt County
Baldwin Falls – 
Gold Dust Falls –

Lake County 

 The "Jams" Rapid Falls 30 ft (9.1m)

Mendocino County
Dora Falls – 
Chamberlain Creek Falls – 
Russian Gulch Falls –

Modoc County
Mill Creek Falls –  +

Napa County
Zim Zim Falls –

Nevada County
Bowman Lake Falls (Sawmill Falls, Canyon Creek Falls) –

Placer County
Devils Falls – 
East Snow Mountain Falls –  + 
Grouse Falls – 
Heath Falls –  +
Hidden Falls – 
New York Canyon Falls –  +
Petroglyph Falls – 
Wabena Falls –

Plumas County
Chambers Creek Falls – 
Fern Falls – 
Frazier Falls – 
Halsey Falls (Hawlsey Falls) – 
Indian Falls – 
Little Jamieson Falls –

Shasta County

Burney Falls – 
McCloud River Falls (Falls of the McCloud River)  –  +
Kings Creek Falls – 
Pit River Falls – 
Potem Falls – 
The Cascades (Kings Creek) – 
Whiskeytown Falls –  +

Siskiyou County
Ash Creek Falls
Coquette Falls
Hedge Creek Falls – 
Ishi Pishi Falls
Mossbrae Falls
Mud Creek Falls (Konwakiton Falls)
Whitney Falls –

Tehama County
Battle Creek Falls – 
Bluff Falls – 
Deer Creek Falls – 
Mill Creek Falls –

Central California

Contra Costa County
Mount Diablo Falls

Fresno County

Big Creek Falls (Kerckhoff Cascade, The Cascada)
Crystal Veil Falls
Dinkey Creek Falls –  + 
Garlic Falls – 
Grizzly Falls – 
Minnow Creek Falls – 
Mist Falls – 
Purple Lake Falls –  + 
Redwood Creek Falls –  +
Roaring River Falls – 
Royce Falls (Royce Lake Falls) –  + 
Silver Pass Falls – 
Silver Spray Falls –  + 
Slissate Falls – 
Stevenson Creek Falls – 
Tenmile Creek Falls – 
Triple Falls –

Inyo County
Darwin Falls – 
Portal Falls (Whitney Portal Falls, Lone Pine Creek Falls) –  +

Madera County
Angel Falls
Camino Falls – 
Chiquito Creek Falls – 
Corlieu Falls – 
Jackass Falls – 
Nydiver Falls
Rainbow Falls – 
Reconnaissance Creek Falls – 
Hidden Falls –

Marin County
Alamere Falls –  + 
Cascade Falls
Cataract Falls
Dawn Falls –

Mariposa County

Bridalveil Fall – 
Chain Cascade (Cascade Cliffs) – 
Chilnualna Falls – 
Fissure Falls –  + 
Horsetail Fall – 
Illilouette Fall – 
Lehamite Falls – 
Nevada Fall – 
Pywiack Cascade – 
Quaking Aspen Falls – 
Ribbon Fall – 
Royal Arch Cascade – 
Sentinel Fall – 
Silver Strand Falls – 
Snow Creek Falls – 
Staircase Falls – 
The Cascades (Cascade Falls) – 
Three Chute Falls – 
Vernal Fall – 
Widow's Tears – 
Wildcat Falls – 
Yosemite Falls –

Mono County
Aspen Falls
Big Bend Falls – 
Ellery Lake Falls
Gem Lake Falls
Leavitt Falls – 
Lee Vining Falls
Minaret Falls –  +
Rush Creek Falls (Horsetail Falls) –  + 
Sardine Falls

Monterey County

Limekiln Falls – 
McWay Falls – 
Salmon Creek Falls –

San Mateo County
Elliot Creek Falls
Peters Creek Falls
Pomponio Falls – 
Tip Toe Falls –

Santa Clara County

Basin Falls – 
Black Rock Falls – 
Granuja Falls
Triple Falls – 
Uvas Falls

Santa Cruz County
Berry Creek Falls – 
Castle Rock Falls – 
Golden Cascade
Silver Falls –

Tulare County

Black Wolf Falls – 
Broder Falls (Coyote Creek Falls) –  + 
Brush Creek Falls
Cascade Falls (Yucca Creek Falls) –  +
Chagoopa Falls – 
Crystal Creek Falls
Franklin Falls
Freeman Creek Falls – 
Marble Falls (Marble Fork Falls) – 
Middle Fork Tule River Falls – 
Panther Creek Falls
Peppermint Creek Falls – 
Rock Creek Falls – 
Salmon Creek Falls –  + 
South Creek Falls – 
South Fork Kaweah River Falls
Sky Blue Lake Falls – 
Three-Falls-Below-The Gate (Mineral King Falls) – 
Tokopah Falls (Tokopah Valley Falls) – 
Tufa Falls –  +
Volcano Falls (Golden Trout Creek Falls)

Tuolumne County

California Falls – 
Clavey Falls
Le Conte Falls – 
Niagara Creek Falls – 
Piute Falls
Rancheria Falls
Tueeulala Falls – 
Tuolumne Falls – 
Wapama Falls – 
Waterwheel Falls – 
White Cascade –

Southern California

Kern County
Spear Creek Falls (Poso Creek Falls)

Los Angeles County

Bailey Canyon Falls – 
Eaton Canyon Falls – 
Escondido Falls – 
Falls Creek Falls – 
Fish Canyon Falls – 
Fox Creek Falls – 
Grand Chasm Falls (Rainbow Falls)
Hermit Falls – 
Leontine Falls
Lodged Boulder Falls
Maidenhair Falls
Millard Canyon Falls – 
Moss Grotto Falls
Newton Canyon Falls
Ribbon Rock Falls
Roaring Rift Falls
San Antonio Falls – 
Saucer Branch Falls (Punch Bowl)
Sturtevant Falls – 
Switzer Falls – 
Thalehaha Falls (Bridal Veil Falls) – 
Trail Canyon Falls – 
Wolfskill Falls – 
Zuma Canyon Falls –

Orange County
Black Star Canyon Falls – 
Falls Canyon Falls – 
Holy Jim Falls – 
Laurel Canyon Falls –

Riverside County

Ortega Falls – 
San Juan Falls – 
Tahquitz Falls – 
Tenaja Falls –

San Bernardino County
Big Falls – 
Bonita Falls (Bonita Canyon Falls) –  + 
Etiwanda Falls – 
Frustration Creek Falls – 
Monkeyface Falls – 
Sapphire Falls

San Diego County
Adobe Falls
Cedar Creek Falls – 
Kitchen Creek Falls –  +
Three Sisters Falls (Devils Punchbowl) - 
Mildred Falls - 
Maidenhair Falls -

San Luis Obispo County
Big Falls –  + 
Nacimiento Falls –

Santa Barbara County

Mission Falls
Nojoqui Falls – 
Rattlesnake Falls
San Ysidro Falls
Seven Falls
Sisquoc Falls – 
Tangerine Falls (West Fork Cold Springs Falls) –

Ventura County
La Jolla Canyon Falls – 
Matilija Falls –  + 
Paradise Falls (Wildwood Falls) – 
Piru Creek Falls – 
Rose Valley Falls – 
Santa Paula Canyon Falls (The Punchbowl) – 
Santa Ynez Falls
Solstice Canyon Falls – 
Tar Creek Falls (Emerald Falls) –  +

Tallest waterfalls

See also
List of waterfalls
List of waterfalls of the United States

References

External links
All waterfalls in California – World Waterfall Database

California
Lists of landforms of California